Dahira klaudiae is a moth of the family Sphingidae which is endemic to China.

It is very similar to Dahira yunnanfuana but distinguishable by the reddish-brown rather than greyish-brown ground colour of the hindwing upperside.

References

External links

klaudiae
Moths described in 2006
Endemic fauna of China
Moths of Asia